Mark Hughes (born 3 February 1962, Port Talbot) is a footballer who played as central defender for Bristol Rovers, Torquay United, Swansea City, Bristol City, Tranmere Rovers and Shrewsbury Town. At Tranmere he was part of the side that won the 1989–90 EFL Trophy.

References

1962 births
Living people
Sportspeople from Port Talbot
Welsh footballers
Association football defenders
Bristol Rovers F.C. players
English Football League players
Torquay United F.C. players
Swansea City A.F.C. players
Bristol City F.C. players
Tranmere Rovers F.C. players
Shrewsbury Town F.C. players